N. terrestris may refer to:
 Nayalia terrestris, an alga species
 Neochloris terrestris, an alga species
 Notosuchus terrestris, an extinct crocodile species

See also
 Terrestris